Pierce Waring (born 18 November 1998) is an Australian professional footballer who plays as a forward for National Premier Leagues Victoria club Green Gully.

Personal life
Born in Melbourne to an Australian father and a Japanese mother, Waring moved to Shanghai when he was just two years old, as his parents were working in China, before moving to Japan for another four years. Waring subsequently moved back to Melbourne at the age of eight.

Club career

Melbourne Victory Reserves
Waring made his youth debut in 2015 after gaining promotion from the under 20 team under John Aloisi. Waring won the 2016/2017 National Youth League Golden Boot.

Melbourne Victory
Pierce Waring signed his first professional A-League contract with the Melbourne Victory squad in September 2017. On 24 February 2018, he made his first appearance coming on in the 85th minute as a substitute for Besart Berisha against Adelaide United.

Waring made his debut first-team start on 18 April 2018 in an AFC Champions League match against Shanghai SIPG. In the same match, Waring scored his debut first-team goal in the 40th minute of the match, in an eventual 2–1 win.

Cerezo Osaka
On 4 July 2018, Waring joined J1 League club Cerezo Osaka.

International career
Waring represented Australia at the 2015 FIFA U-17 World Cup, scoring his first international goal against Germany.

Honours

Club
 Melbourne Victory Reserves
 2016/17 NYL Golden Boot

References

External links
 Melbourne Victory profile 
 

1998 births
Living people
Australian soccer players
Australia youth international soccer players
Australian expatriate soccer players
Australian people of Japanese descent
Melbourne Victory FC players
Cerezo Osaka players
Bentleigh Greens SC players
Sichuan Jiuniu F.C. players
A-League Men players
J3 League players
National Premier Leagues players
China League One players
Australian expatriate sportspeople in Japan
Expatriate footballers in Japan
Australian expatriate sportspeople in China
Expatriate footballers in China
Association football forwards